Howard Maxwell (born January 23, 1949) is an American politician who served in the Georgia House of Representatives from 2003 to 2019.

References

1949 births
Living people
Republican Party members of the Georgia House of Representatives